OCT Tower is a skyscraper in Overseas Chinese Town, Shenzhen, China. It is 300 meters tall and has 60 floors. It is the 15th tallest building in Shenzhen. It functions as an office building. The building was first proposed in 2013 and construction started in 2015 and the building was finished in 2019. The architect was Kohn Pedersen Fox.

See also

List of tallest buildings in Shenzhen
List of tallest buildings in China
Overseas Chinese Town

References 

Skyscrapers in Shenzhen
Skyscraper office buildings in Shenzhen
Nanshan District, Shenzhen